Ringgold County is a county located in the U.S. state of Iowa. As of the 2020 census, the population was 4,663, making it the Iowa county with the second-smallest population. The county seat is Mount Ayr. The county is named after Maj. Samuel Ringgold, a hero of the Battle of Palo Alto fought in May 1846, during the Mexican–American War. It is one of the 26 Iowa counties with a name that is unique across the nation.

Geography

Major highways
  U.S. Highway 169
  Iowa Highway 2
  Iowa Highway 25

Adjacent counties
 Union County (north)
 Decatur County (east)
 Harrison County, Missouri (southeast)
 Worth County, Missouri (southwest)
 Taylor County (west)

Demographics

2020 census
There were 2,672 housing units, of which 1,945 were occupied.

2010 census
There were 2,613 housing units, of which 2,047 were occupied.

2000 census

As of the census of 2000, there were 5,469 people, 2,245 households, and 1,537 families in the county. The population density was 10 people per square mile (4/km2). There were 2,789 housing units at an average density of 5 per square mile (2/km2). The racial makeup of the county was 99.07% White, 0.11% Black or African American, 0.22% Native American, 0.16% Asian, 0.02% from other races, and 0.42% from two or more races. 0.24% of the population were Hispanic or Latino of any race.

Of the 2,245 households 27.70% had children under the age of 18 living with them, 59.70% were married couples living together, 5.50% had a female householder with no husband present, and 31.50% were non-families. 28.60% of households were one person and 17.80% were one person aged 65 or older. The average household size was 2.37 and the average family size was 2.90.

The age distribution was 24.00% under the age of 18, 6.90% from 18 to 24, 21.40% from 25 to 44, 23.60% from 45 to 64, and 24.00% 65 or older. The median age was 43 years. For every 100 females there were 94.10 males. For every 100 females age 18 and over, there were 89.40 males.

The median household income was $29,110 and the median family income  was $34,472. Males had a median income of $24,583 versus $20,606 for females. The per capita income for the county was $15,023. About 9.40% of families and 14.30% of the population were below the poverty line, including 20.40% of those under age 18 and 16.40% of those age 65 or over.

Communities

Cities

 Beaconsfield
 Benton
 Clearfield (pt)
 Delphos
 Diagonal
 Ellston
 Kellerton
 Maloy
 Mount Ayr
 Redding
 Shannon City (pt)
 Tingley

Census-designated place
 Sun Valley Lake

Unincorporated communities

Townships

 Athens
 Benton
 Clinton
 Grant
 Jefferson
 Liberty
 Lincoln
 Lotts Creek
 Middle Fork
 Monroe
 Poe
 Rice
 Riley
 Tingley
 Union
 Washington
 Waubonsie

Population ranking
The population ranking of the following table is based on the 2020 census of Ringgold County.

† county seat

Politics

See also

 National Register of Historic Places listings in Ringgold County, Iowa
 Ringgold County Courthouse

Notes

References

External links

 Ringgold County Portal style website maintained by the Ringgold County government
 Ringgold County history and information

 
1847 establishments in Iowa
Populated places established in 1847